The 2002 MBNA America 500 was the fourth stock car race of the 2002 NASCAR Winston Cup Series and the fifth iteration of the event. The race was held on Sunday, March 10, 2002, in Hampton, Georgia at Atlanta Motor Speedway, a  permanent asphalt quad-oval intermediate speedway. The race took the scheduled 325 laps to complete. Tony Stewart, driving for Joe Gibbs Racing, would pass the worn-out car of Ward Burton with 23 to go to win his 13th career NASCAR Winston Cup Series win and his first of the season. To fill out the podium, Dale Earnhardt Jr. of Dale Earnhardt, Inc. and Jimmie Johnson of Hendrick Motorsports would finish second and third, respectively.

Background 

Atlanta Motor Speedway (formerly Atlanta International Raceway) is a track in Hampton, Georgia, 20 miles (32 km) south of Atlanta. It is a 1.54-mile (2.48 km) quad-oval track with a seating capacity of 111,000. It opened in 1960 as a 1.5-mile (2.4 km) standard oval. In 1994, 46 condominiums were built over the northeastern side of the track. In 1997, to standardize the track with Speedway Motorsports' other two 1.5-mile (2.4 km) ovals, the entire track was almost completely rebuilt. The frontstretch and backstretch were swapped, and the configuration of the track was changed from oval to quad-oval. The project made the track one of the fastest on the NASCAR circuit.

Entry list

Practice

First practice 
The first practice session was held on Friday, March 8, at 11:20 AM EST, and would last for two hours.

Second practice 
The second practice session was held on Saturday, March 9, at 9:30 AM EST, and would last for 45 minutes.

Third and final practice 
The third and final practice session, sometimes referred to as Happy Hour, was held on Saturday, March 9, at 11:15 AM EST, and would last for 45 minutes.

Qualifying 
Qualifying was held on Friday, March 8, at 3:05 PM EST. Each driver would have two laps to set a fastest time; the fastest of the two would count as their official qualifying lap. Positions 1-36 would be decided on time, while positions 37-43 would be based on provisionals. Six spots are awarded by the use of provisionals based on owner's points. The seventh is awarded to a past champion who has not otherwise qualified for the race. If no past champ needs the provisional, the next team in the owner points will be awarded a provisional.

Two drivers would fail to qualify: Ron Hornaday Jr. and Carl Long.

Full qualifying results

Race results

References 

2002 NASCAR Winston Cup Series
NASCAR races at Atlanta Motor Speedway
March 2002 sports events in the United States
2002 in sports in Georgia (U.S. state)